Diamond Necklace is a 2012 Indian Malayalam-language romantic drama film directed by Lal Jose and written by Iqbal Kuttippuram, starring Fahadh Faasil and Anusree. This movie tells the life story of Dubai-based oncologist Dr. Arun Kumar and the end of his luxurious life after meeting three women from different lifestyles.

Diamond Necklace was released on 4 May 2012. It was a commercial success at the box office and received positive response from critics. The film won two Filmfare Awards South—Best Supporting Actress (Gauthami Nair) and Best Music Director.

Plot
Dr. Arun Kumar is a young oncologist based in Dubai. He lives off of credit cards, drives luxurious cars and enjoys life to the hilt without worrying about the future. The risk of credit card debt is evidenced when his car is towed by his creditors.

The movie also focuses on his relationship with the people around him. There is Dr. Savithri Akka, his boss in the hospital who spoils him with sisterly affection. Lakshmi, a newly recruited Tamil nurse in his department, may be the first girl Arun is seriously smitten with. Lakshmi has come to Dubai to fulfill her mother's dream of building a hospital in their village, as her father died due to lack of proper treatment. Arun and Lakshmi secretly start dating and end up consummating their relation.

Meanwhile, Maya a relative of Savithri, a fashion designer who was based in the UK and Paris and now settled in Dubai, wants to start her own boutique in Dubai. Maya is engaged to Deepak, who is in France. Maya is diagnosed with cancer and treated by Savithri. Deepak leaves her due to her illness, leaving Maya depressed. While moving Maya's belongings to the ward, Arun notices a diamond necklace worth .

One day, Venu, a laborer from his town in Kerala, informs Arun that his mother is not well. Arun cannot leave the country due to his creditors. He gets to meet Narayana Menon, who also happens to be from his place. Through Narayanan's influence, Arun is granted permission to leave the country. When he arrives in India, he is tricked into marrying Narayanan's niece, Rajasree. Rajasree is a typical "village" girl who has no clue about city life.

When he returns, he learns that his friend's family has returned and he can no longer stay with him. He searches for a space, but finds that he lacks the funds to pay the advance. He moves to the labor camp where Venu is staying. Lakshmi learns that Arun is married and puts an end to their relationship. He ends up staying with Maya, who is searching for a person to share her spacious flat. Arun and Maya develop a liking for each other. Maya is unaware of the fact that Arun is married. Savithri forces Arun to vacate Maya's flat and bring Rajasree to Dubai. Arun vacates Maya's flat, he brings his wife Rajasree to Dubai, and the couple starts staying together.

Maya and Arun see each other on Maya's last day in her flat and they have sex as Maya is unaware of Arun's marriage with Rajasree. A few days later Maya happens to see Arun and Rajasree together in a mall. This leaves Maya mentally shocked and her illness further aggravates. Injecting morphine, a pain reliever, is the only option. Upon Maya's request to relieve her pain, Arun injects an excess dose of morphine. Arun, to pay off his dues, steals Maya's diamond necklace and replaces it with a fake one, with the intention of returning it when his loan is passed. Meanwhile, Maya admits that she is sorry to have entered into Arun's life and falls asleep. Rajasree, on finding the diamond necklace, thinks it is her birthday gift from her husband Arun.

When Venu learns about Arun's debt, he speaks to the bank manager, pays the first installment, and arranges for Arun to pay back the bank in installments. Maya develops complications from the overdose and narrowly escapes death. Lakshmi, who is on duty at that time and had injected an initial dose of the pain reliever, is dismissed from duty. Maya leaves the hospital, leaving a gift cover with Savithri to be given to Rajasree by her husband, Arun. When Arun opens the cover the gift eventually turns out to be the fake diamond necklace that he replaced.

Arun drops Lakshmi at the airport, and puts the original diamond necklace into her bag, so she can fulfill the dream that she and her mother had seen, the hospital. Although she lost her hair as a result of the treatments, Maya is now shown living a lonely but happy life in a remote Himalayan valley remembering Arun's words to live life without worrying about past and future.

The story ends with Arun realizing that Rajasree loved him more than the diamond necklace (the fake one, a fact that Rajasree was unaware of) that he had given her, when she throws it into the ocean to prove her love to him, and the movie ends with him hugging her.

Cast

Production

Development
The movie has Fahadh Faasil in the lead, with three heroines played by Anusree, Samvrutha Sunil, and Gauthami Nair . The movie was produced by Lal Jose and P. V. Pradeep, under the banners of LJ Films and Anitha Productions. Produced as a debut venture of his production house LJ films, the movie has him uniting with Iqbal Kuttippuram. The lyrics were written by Rafeeq Ahmed and the music was composed by Vidyasagar. The audiography was done by M. R. Rajakrishnan.

Casting
It was widely reported that Amala Paul had agreed to play a female lead in the film, but she was later replaced by Gauthami Nair.

Filming
The movie was filming in Dubai in February and March 2012. The film had a 55-member crew in Dubai. Diamond Necklace was the first Indian film to be shot inside Burj Khalifa. A dance sequence featuring Faasil was shot in The Dubai Mall. Filming also included locations such as the Armani Residences, Atlantis The Palm, and Dubai Gold Souk.

Soundtrack

The original soundtrack and background score were composed by Vidyasagar, who had collaborated with Lal Jose in his previous films. Rafeeq Ahammed wrote the lyrics for the songs.

Release
Diamond Necklace was released on 4 May 2012, alongside Grandmaster and Mallu Singh on that weekend. In September 2013, Press Trust of India reported that Jose is planning to remake the film in Hindi, Jose said "nothing has been finalised as of now".

Critical reception
The movie received generally positive reviews. The film was noted for its performances, visuals, story and its realistic portrayal. Rediff rated the film 3.5 out of 5 stars and concluded that "One can just end by saying that Lal Jose puts his might behind the change sweeping Malayalam Cinema of late and has come out with a Diamond Necklace that is not to be missed." Times of India gave the film 3 out of 5 stars and commented "it is a beautifully shot movie put together with some stirring moments and hearty one-liners by scriptwriter Dr. Iqbal Kuttippuram."

Box office
The film was both commercial and critical success. It ran over 100 days in theatres. It grossed  from 2 theatres in the opening weekend in the United Kingdom.

Accolades
Fahadh won the Asianet Youth Icon Award for this film. Gauthami won the Best Supporting Actress and Vidyasagar received the Filmfare Award for Best Music Director and was nominated for a SIIMA Award for Best Music Director. It won the Asiavision Awards for Best Movie and Best Performer of the Year for Fahadh.

References

External links
 

2010s Malayalam-language films
Films directed by Lal Jose
Films about financial crises
Works about debt
Films about physicians
Indian comedy-drama films
Economics films
Films set in Dubai
Films scored by Vidyasagar
2012 comedy-drama films
2012 films
Films shot in Dubai